Wildenvey is a surname. Notable people with the surname include:

Gisken Wildenvey (1892–1985), Norwegian novelist and author of short stories
Herman Wildenvey (1885–1959), Norwegian poet